The A48 autoroute, also known as l'autoroute du Dauphiné, is a motorway in France connecting the A43 with the city of Grenoble.

An extension north to Ambérieu is proposed in the medium term.

Characteristics
 2x2 lanes
 2x3 lanes between the A49 and A480 autoroutes (10 km)
 97 km long
 Service areas

History
 1968: The first toll free section opened between the Bastille (Grenoble northern edge) and Voreppe as part of the preparations for the Winter Olympics held in the city and surrounding area.
 1975: Opening of the toll section between Voreppe and the A43 managed by AREA.

Junctions

Places of interest
The following list indexes towns and places of interest that can be visited from the motorway:
River Isère
Col de Rossatière
Lac de Paladru
Chartreuse Mountains

Future
There are proposals to extend the autoroute north from Bourgoin-Jallieu to Ambérieu-in-Bugey and connecting to the A42 autoroute.

External links

A48 autoroute in Saratlas

Autoroutes in France